Knocked down may refer to:
 Complete knock down, a car kit
 Knockout in combat sports